Mario Mosböck (born 7 May 1996) is an Austrian footballer who last played as a forward for SC Wiener Neustadt.

References

External links
 

1996 births
Living people
Austrian footballers
Association football forwards
SKN St. Pölten players
Austrian Football Bundesliga players
SC Wiener Neustadt players
2. Liga (Austria) players